Lupeni (German: Schylwolfsbach, Hungarian: Lupény) is a mining city in the Jiu Valley in Hunedoara County, Romania, in the historical region of Transylvania. It is one of the oldest and largest cities in the Jiu Valley.

The name is derived from the Romanian "lup", meaning "wolf". Throughout the second part of the 19th century and most of the 20th century, the city's economy was based on mining, but since the 1990s the economy has become more diverse, after many mines were closed.

History
The first records of people inhabiting this area date back to prehistorical times, as evidenced by the discoveries made at the Straja-Lupeni hill cave, where old pottery objects were found. The city of Lupeni was first attested in 1770. During the Middle Ages, the Jiu Valley was sparsely  populated, with the inhabitants living in small villages, and shepherding being the main activity.

Lupeni was formed as a result of the intense migration of people coming from Valea Streiului and Țara Hațegului, who were attracted by the rich pastures and hayfields of the area. The residents of the village of Valea Lupului (Wolf Valley) are those who are believed to have founded Lupeni.

After 1840, mining exploration and exploitation started to develop in the area, and major economic and social changes took place. Foreign workers, primarily Polish, Czech, Austrian, Slovak, and Hungarian miners, as well as Romanian miners from the Apuseni Mountains and Baia Mare, were brought to work in the Jiu Valley. The mining activity began south of Lupeni. Lupeni soon become a major coal producer with a mono-industrial development, with about 80% of the population living from mining and other related activities. The city become very prosperous and experienced continuous population growth. However, the industrial development of the area was severely affected by the economic crisis of the interwar period, which eventually led to the Lupeni Strike of 1929.

During the communist regime, the mines were nationalized by the communist government. Lupeni was declared a city in 1941, at which time it had 12,000 inhabitants. In 1977, Lupeni was the site of the Jiu Valley miners' strike of 1977. After the revolution, in the 1990s, mining operations entered a restructuring process that had a very strong social and economic impact on the city. A large number of mines were closed, and this also affected other related activities, such as suppliers of materials, equipment and services, and agents that operated in the trade and services areas. Nevertheless, in recent years, new areas of economic development emerged, such as tourism, forestry industry, bakery industry, and commerce.

The city's remaining active mine is the Lupeni Coal Mine managed by the Petroșani-based National Hard Coal Company.

Population

By nationality
Romanians: 19,465 (88.53%)
Hungarians: 1,581 (7.19%)
Roma (Gypsy): 735 (3.34%)
Germans: 71 (0.32%)

By religion
Orthodox: 24,815
Roman Catholic: 1,921
Reformed: 1,562
Pentecostal: 688
Greek Catholic: 501
Baptist 200-300
Other: 1,155

See also
Jiu Valley

Notes

External links

Jiu Valley Portal - the regional portal host of the Lupeni city website
Science Highschool of Lupeni

Populated places in Hunedoara County
Jiu Valley
Cities in Romania
Mining communities in Romania
Monotowns in Romania
Localities in Transylvania